Rainy Ridge is located on the border of Alberta and British Columbia on the Continental Divide. It was named in 1958 origin of the name is unknown.

See also
 List of peaks on the Alberta–British Columbia border
 Mountains of Alberta
 Mountains of British Columbia

References

Rainy Ridge
Rainy Ridge
Canadian Rockies